Austria was represented by Simone Stelzer in the Eurovision Song Contest 1990 with the song "Keine Mauern mehr".

Before Eurovision

National final 
The Austrian national final took place on 15 March in Studio Z1 of the ORF-Zentrum in Vienna, hosted by Lizzi Engstler, the Austrian entry of the 1982 contest. 

The winner was decided through a mixture of televoting (50%) and an expert jury (50%). The winner of the final was Duett with the song "Das Beste", however they were disqualified after it was revealed they had competed with the same song in the 1988 German national final. The winner was then declared as Simone Stelzer with the song "Keine Mauern mehr".

At Eurovision
Stelzer performed 20th on the night of the contest, following Italy and preceding Cyprus. At the close of the voting she had received 58 points, placing 10th of 22 countries competing.

Voting

References

External links
Austrian National Final 1990

1990
Countries in the Eurovision Song Contest 1990
Eurovision